Princess is a 2006  Danish adult animated drama film directed by Anders Morgenthaler and co-written by Morgenthaler and Mette Heeno. The film tells the harsh story of a 32-year old missionary named August (Thure Lindhardt) whose sister, a former porn star nicknamed "The Princess," has died of drug abuse and left behind her 5-year-old daughter. August adopts the child and they embark on a violent mission of vengeance to destroy all existing pornographic material featuring Princess.

Princess, rated for mature audiences, won awards at three European film festivals and was nominated for the 2007 Robert Award for Best Danish Film.

Cast
Thure Lindhardt as August (voice)
Stine Fischer Christensen as Christina (voice)
Jens Arentzen
Rasmus Bjerg 
Jiming Cai 
Liv Corfixen as Hooker in car (voice)
Ida Dwinger as Mother (voice)
Mira Hilli Møller Hallund as Mia (voice)
Rikke Hallund 
Henrik Ibsen 
Tommy Kenter as Preben (voice)
Margrethe Koytu as Karen (voice)
Søren Lenander as Sonny (voice)
Karen Rosenberg as Woman (voice)
Christian Tafdrup as Charlie
Peter van Hoof as Various Characters (voice)
Niels Weyde as Officer Andersen (voice)
Gunnar Wille

References

External links
Princess at IMDb
Princess at Det Danske Filmistitut (in Danish)
Review of Princess at BeyondHollywood.com

Danish animated films
2006 animated films
2006 films
Films directed by Anders Morgenthaler
2006 directorial debut films
Adult animated films